The 2020 Armenian Cup Final was the 29th Armenian Cup Final, and the final match of the 2019–20 Armenian Cup. It was played at the Football Academy Stadium in Yerevan, Armenia, on 10 July 2020, contested by Noah and Ararat-Armenia. This was the first appearance for both clubs in the Final of the Armenian Cup, with Noah defeating Ararat-Armenia 7–6 on penalties after the match finished 5–5. Since both Noah and Ararat-Armenia had already qualified for European competitions via the Armenian Premier League, it meant fourth placed Shirak would also enter the 2020–21 UEFA Europa League at the first qualifying round.

Match

Details

Notes

References

Armenian Cup Finals
Cup Final